Madhuca sepilokensis is a tree in the family Sapotaceae. It is named for Sepilok in Malaysia's Sabah state.

Description
Inflorescences bear up to six flowers.

Distribution and habitat
Madhuca sepilokensis is endemic to Borneo. Its habitat is lowland mixed dipterocarp forest to  altitude.

Conservation
Madhuca sepilokensis has been assessed as endangered on the IUCN Red List. The species is threatened by logging and conversion of land for palm oil plantations.

References

sepilokensis
Endemic flora of Borneo
Trees of Borneo
Plants described in 1960